Elections to Lewisham London Borough Council were held in May 1982.  The whole council was up for election. Turnout was 36.4%.

Election result

|}

Ward results

References

1982
1982 London Borough council elections
May 1982 events in the United Kingdom